Malcolm Denzil Marshall (18 April 1958 – 4 November 1999) was a Barbadian cricketer. Primarily a fast bowler, Marshall is widely regarded as one of the greatest and one of the most accomplished fast bowlers of the modern era in Test cricket. He is often acknowledged as the greatest West Indian fast bowler of all time, and certainly one of the most complete fast bowlers the cricketing world ever saw. His Test bowling average of 20.94 is the best of anyone who has taken 200 or more wickets. He generated fearsome pace from his bowling action, with a dangerous bouncer. He also statistically went on to become the most successful test match bowler of the 1980s with 235 scalps with an average of 18.47 within a time period of just five years.

Marshall was also a very dangerous lower middle-order batsman with ten Test fifties and seven first-class centuries. He ended his career as the all-time highest wicket taker for West Indies in test cricket with 376 wickets, a record which he held up until November 1998 before Courtney Walsh surpassed his milestone.

In 2009, Marshall was inducted into the ICC Cricket Hall of Fame. To mark 150 years of the Cricketers' Almanack, Wisden named him in an all-time Test World XI.

Early years
Marshall was born in Bridgetown, Barbados. His father, Denzil DeCoster Edghill, also a cricketer who played for Kingspark cricket club in St. Philip and the son of Claudine Edghill and Guirdwood Ifill, was a policeman; he died in a traffic accident when Marshall was one year old. His mother was Eleanor Welch. Malcolm had three half-brothers and three half-sisters. He grew up in the parish of Saint Michael, Barbados and was educated at St Giles Boys' School from 1963 to 1969 and then at Parkinson Comprehensive from 1969 to 1973.

He was partly taught cricket by his grandfather, who helped to bring him up after his father's death. He played cricket for the Banks Brewery team from 1976. His first representative match was a 40-over affair for West Indies Young Cricketers against their English equivalents at Pointe-à-Pierre, Trinidad and Tobago in August 1976. He made nought and his eight overs disappeared for 53 runs. He idolised legendary West Indies allrounder Sir Garfield Sobers at his young age and he started admiring Sobers after watching the magnificent test century by Sobers against New Zealand in 1972.

Marshall's initial senior appearance was a Geddes Grant/Harrison Line Trophy (List A) match for Barbados on 13 February 1978; again he got out without scoring and did not take a wicket. Four days later, he made his first-class debut against Jamaica, and whilst he failed to score runs, he claimed 6–77 in the Jamaican first innings. On the back of this single first-class appearance he was selected to tour India in 1978/79, many first-choice West Indian stars being unavailable having committed themselves to playing World Series Cricket. Marshall heard of his selection on the radio while working in the storeroom at Banks Brewery and later claimed he did not know where India was.

International debut
Marshall made his test début in the second test against India at Bangalore on 15 December 1978. He immediately developed a career-long antipathy to Dilip Vengsarkar due to his aggressive appealing. Despite doing little of note in the three Tests he played on that tour, he did take 37 wickets in all first-class games, and Hampshire saw enough in him to take him on as their overseas player as a successor to Andy Roberts for 1979, remaining with the county until 1993. He was in West Indies' World Cup squad, but did not play a match in the tournament. Hampshire were not doing well at the time, but nevertheless he took 47 first-class wickets, as well as picking up 5–13 against Glamorgan in the John Player League.

Marshall came to prominence in 1980, when in the third Test at Old Trafford he accounted for Mike Gatting, Brian Rose and Peter Willey in short order to spark an England collapse, although the match was eventually drawn despite Marshall taking 3–36 (and 2–116 in the second innings). After 1980/81 he was out of the Test side for two years, but an excellent 1982 season with Hampshire when he took 134 wickets at under 16 apiece, including a career-best 8–71 against Worcestershire, saw him recalled and thereafter he remained a fixture until the end of his international career. As of 2022 Marshall's performance in 1982 remains the highest haul of first-class wickets by any bowler in an English season for over fifty years, since a reduction in the annual number of County Championship matches in 1969.

In seven successive Test series from 1982/83 to 1985/86 he took 21 or more wickets each time, in the last five of them averaging under 20. His most productive series in this period was the 1983/84 rubber against India, when he claimed 33 wickets as well as averaging 34 with the bat and making his highest Test score of 92 at Kanpur. A few months later he took five in an innings twice at home against Australia. In 1982, he signed a one-year contract with Melbourne Sub-District side Moorabbin and he eventually became the first active international cricketer to sign up for the Sub-District league. Marshall was reportedly approached by the Moorabbin officials during the first test match between Australia and West Indies at Melbourne in December 2021 after learning that Marshall was interested in playing domestic cricket in Australia. At the peak of his career, he turned down an offer of US$1 million to join a rebel West Indies team on a tour to South Africa, still suffering international sporting isolation due to apartheid.

At the peak

Marshall relinquished his county duties during the 1984 tour of England. In a Test series that came to be known as the "Blackwash", the West Indians completed a 5–0 triumph, to date the only visiting team in England to have achieved such a feat. Marshall played a key role, taking the second-most wickets in the series with 24, behind only Joel Garner who took 29, and establishing his reputation as one of the finest bowlers in the world. In the series, he took five or more wickets in an innings three times, had the best bowling average – conceding only 18.20 runs per wicket, and the best strike rate – averaging one wicket every 42 deliveries.

In the first test at Edgbaston, which the West Indies won by an innings and 180 runs, he ended the Test career of local Warwickshire opener Andy Lloyd after half an hour; he had already faced a few short deliveries from both Marshall and Garner but was then caught unawares by a delivery from Marshall that rose sharply and struck him flush on the temple behind his right eye. Lloyd soon had to retire hurt when he realized he was suffering blurred vision in his right eye and was hospitalized for several days. Lloyd would remain stranded on 10 runs without being dismissed and he never went onto play international cricket again leaving him with a unique record of being the only opening batsman in test cricket to have never been dismissed by any bowler.

In the third Test at Headingley, Marshall ran through England's batting order in the second innings to finish with 7/53, despite having broken his thumb in two different places when he attempted to field a stroke played by Chris Broad on the first morning in the first innings. He also came out to bat at number 11 in West Indies' first innings despite his injury, allowing his team to gain a further psychological advantage as Larry Gomes completed an unbeaten century (Marshall batted one-handed that day, with one arm in plaster). Marshall himself also contributed to the team with the bat scoring a boundary with an inside-out forehand down the line. Marshall was dismissed soon after Larry Gomes had completed the century. Even though the partnership lasted for just 16 minutes and with only 12 runs being produced, it turned out to be one of the most memorable test match partnerships for the tenth wicket. His heroics by batting and bowling with a broken thumb also impressed his captain Clive Lloyd who recalled the incident as one of the greatest and most courageous efforts that he ever witnessed during his playing career.

In 1984/85 Marshall had another successful series at home against New Zealand, although there were calls for his bouncers to be ruled as intimidatory beyond what was acceptable, and that Marshall should have been admonished by the umpires. A rising delivery broke the nose of England batsman Mike Gatting in a one-day match in February 1986; Marshall later found bone fragments embedded in the leather of the ball. As well as the bouncer, however, Marshall succeeded in swinging the ball in both directions. He also used an in-swinging yorker as well as developing an effective leg-cutter, and with the exception of the 1986/87 New Zealanders, against whom he could only manage nine wickets at 32.11, no side seemed to have an answer to him.

1988 saw his career-best Test performance of 7–22 at Old Trafford, and he ended the series with 35 wickets in five Tests, at 12.65. Marshall was coming towards the end of his international career, moreover, and though he took 11 wickets in the match against India at Port of Spain the following winter, he played his last Test at The Oval in 1991. His final Test wicket – his 376th – was that of Graham Gooch. These efforts led him to retain the number 1 ranking in ICC Test Bowling Rankings for the year 1990 (which he attained in 1989).

Later career
Marshall's final appearances for West Indies came in One Day International cricket – the 1992 World Cup. However, in his five matches in the tournament, he took just two wickets, both in the penultimate game against South Africa at Christchurch. This was the only time Marshall played for West Indies against South Africa in his career, though he played provincial cricket for Natal in both 1992/93 and 1993/94. Whilst playing at Natal, his experience was invaluable, and his guidance was an influential spark in the early career of Shaun Pollock. Today, Shaun Pollock attributes much of his success to his mentor, Marshall.

Having missed out on Hampshire's earlier one-day triumphs in the Benson and Hedges Cup in 1988 and the Nat West Trophy in 1991 because of touring commitments with the West Indies, Marshall was in the Hampshire team that won the 1992 Benson and Hedges Cup. He played for Hampshire again in 1993, taking 28 wickets at a shade over 30 runs apiece, but that was to be the end of his time in county cricket. He bade farewell to Hampshire fans in a benefit match at the County Ground, Southampton in September 1993, representing a West Indies XI against the county. As he walked off the pitch after his dismissal, according to a report, "the crowd, as one man, rose to its feet and cheered Marshall every step of the way." This also proved to be one of the last matches at Southampton for David Gower (who Marshall dismissed on the day while bowling off-spin). In 1994 his only game in England was against the South Africans for the Scarborough President's XI during the Festival. He played five matches for Scotland in the 1995 Benson and Hedges Cup without much success, and his last senior games were for Natal in 1995/96. In his final senior appearance, against Western Province in a limited-overs game at Cape Town, the first of his two victims was his former international teammate Desmond Haynes. He took over 1,000 wickets for Hampshire, and received more than £60,000 (tax free) in his benefit year in 1987.

Illness, death and legacy 
In 1996, Marshall became coach both of Hampshire and the West Indies, although the latter's steadily declining standards during this period brought a considerable amount of criticism his way. In 1999, during the World Cup it was revealed that Marshall had colon cancer. He immediately left his coaching job to begin treatment, but this was ultimately unsuccessful. He married his long-term partner, Connie Roberta Earle, in Romsey on 25 September 1999, and returned to his home town, where he died on 4 November aged 41, weighing little more than 25 kg.

"The worldwide outpouring of grief," wrote journalist-friend Pat Symes, "was testimony to the genuine love and admiration he engendered." At the funeral service at the Garfield Sobers Gymnasium in Wildey, Barbados, former West Indian fast bowler Rev. Wes Hall whispered the last rites in the belief that Marshall, having found God again in the last few weeks of his life, was off to Heaven. His coffin was carried at the service by five West Indian captains. He was buried at St Bartholomew's Church, Barbados.

The Malcolm Marshall Memorial Trophy was inaugurated in his memory, to be awarded to the leading wicket-taker in each England v West Indies Test series. Another trophy with the same name was set up to be the prize in an annual game between Barbados and Trinidad and Tobago.

Malcolm Marshall Memorial cricket games are also played in Handsworth Park, Birmingham, England. On the Sunday of the UK's August bank holiday, invitation XIs play against an individual's "select eleven".

The entrance road to Hampshire's ground the Rose Bowl is called Marshall Drive in memory of Marshall and another West Indian Hampshire great Roy Marshall.

His former Hampshire captain, Mark Nicholas, wrote a moving tribute to him.

See also
List of international cricket five-wicket hauls by Malcolm Marshall

Bibliography 
 Symes, Pat. "Memories of Maco." The Wisden Cricketer, May 2008.

References

External links
 

Barbadian cricketers
West Indian cricketers of 1970–71 to 1999–2000
West Indies Test cricketers
West Indies One Day International cricketers
Cricketers at the 1983 Cricket World Cup
Cricketers at the 1992 Cricket World Cup
Barbados cricketers
Hampshire cricketers
KwaZulu-Natal cricketers
Wisden Cricketers of the Year
Wisden Leading Cricketers in the World
Deaths from colorectal cancer
1958 births
1999 deaths
Deaths from cancer in Barbados
Barbadian cricket coaches
Scotland cricketers
Marylebone Cricket Club cricketers
Coaches of the West Indies cricket team
Barbadian expatriate sportspeople in South Africa
Barbadian expatriate sportspeople in Scotland
Cricketers from Bridgetown
Scarborough Festival President's XI cricketers
Barbadian expatriate sportspeople in England